Zoltán Molnár (born 9 January 1971 in Kisvárda) is a Hungarian football player who currently plays for BVSC Budapest.

References

1971 births
Living people
People from Kisvárda
Hungarian footballers
Nyíregyháza Spartacus FC players
Stadler FC footballers
Budapesti VSC footballers
Kiskőrösi FC footballers
Association football midfielders
Sportspeople from Szabolcs-Szatmár-Bereg County